The 16th Ujala Asianet Film Awards geared up at Dubai drew thousands of Malayalam movie fans at the Meydan Hotel & Grand Stand on January 10, 2014. The awards were presented annually by the Asianet TV to honor the artistic and technical excellence in Malayalam Film industry with over 30 award categories. They were held in Dubai for the second time after a successful show there in 2012.

Celebrities who attended the event

The biggest attraction of the ceremony was Bollywood star Shah Rukh Khan, who was honored with the International Icon of Indian Cinema award. The laurel came to King Khan from a million viewers of Asianet, who had selected him for his onscreen aura and the connect that he shares with countless international fans around the world.

He was accompanied by other big names from Malayalam movie industry. The show saw the attendance of stars including Mohanlal, Mammootty, Dileep, Jayaram, Innocent, Priyamani, Kavya Madhavan and also other generation next actors such as Dulquer Salmaan, Fahadh Faasil, Kunchacko Boban, Amala Paul, Nazriya Nazim and many more.

Leading Bollywood composer and singer Shankar Mahadevan gave a live performance, featuring his chartbuster tracks. The Tamil singer Andrea Jeremiah also gave a live performance of her hit Tamil and Telugu songs. MJS, the winners of India's Dancing Superstar also gave a performance.

Malayalam actors Kavya Madhavan, Isha Talwar, Vineeth, Asha Sarath, and gen-next sensation Nazriya Nazim also entertained the audience. Malayalam singer Rimi Tomy paid a tribute to A.R.Rahman by singing his hit songs.

Film award winners

Special awards

References

A
Asianet Film Awards